Edward Campbell Wright (23 April 1874 – 28 July 1947) was an English cricketer active from 1894 to 1902 who played for Gloucestershire, Oxford University and Kent. He was born in South Shields and died in Budleigh Salterton. He appeared in 23 first-class matches as a right-handed batsman who bowled right-arm slow. He scored 420 runs with a highest score of 83 and held 17 catches. He took 52 wickets with a best analysis of five for 44.

References

1874 births
1947 deaths
English cricketers
Gloucestershire cricketers
Kent cricketers
Oxford University cricketers
Alumni of Keble College, Oxford
Cricketers from South Shields